is a railway station in the city of Kashiwazaki, Niigata, Japan, operated by East Japan Railway Company (JR East).

Lines
Raihai Station is served by the Echigo Line and is 15.0 kilometers from the terminus of the line at Kashiwazaki Station.

Station layout

The station consists of a single ground-level side platform serving one bi-directional track, connected to the station building by a level crossing.

The station is unattended. Suica farecard cannot be used at this station.

History
Raihai Station opened on 16 December 1913. With the privatization of Japanese National Railways (JNR) on 1 April 1987, the station came under the control of JR East.

Surrounding area
former Nishiyama Town Office
Raihai Post Office

See also
 List of railway stations in Japan

References

External links

 JR East station information 

Railway stations in Niigata Prefecture
Railway stations in Japan opened in 1913
Echigo Line
Stations of East Japan Railway Company
Kashiwazaki, Niigata